Hotel New York is a hotel in Rotterdam, the Netherlands,  based in the former office building of the Holland America Lines (Nederlandsch Amerikaansche Stoomvaart Maatschappij). It was used as temporary accommodation for European emigres in the late 19th and early 20th centuries: "Often, package deals were available which would combine a train ticket, hotel accommodation and passage over the oceans."

When sailing from Rotterdam to New York was superseded by flying, the building became derelict in the 1980s. It was squatted in 1988.

The building received a new lease on life when entrepreneurs Daan van der Have and Hans Loos, together with designer Dorine de Vos saw the possibility of making a hotel. After several years of rebuilding, the hotel opened in 1993. Since 2006 Hotel New York is operated by WestCord Hotels, the same company that owns the ss Rotterdam, the 1950's flagship of the Holland Amerika Lijn.

Situated in the Kop van Zuid neighbourhood, the building has been a national heritage site since 2000.

The Dutch singer Anouk wrote her album Hotel New York in the hotel.

References

External links 

 

Art Nouveau architecture in the Netherlands
Holland America Line
Rijksmonuments in Rotterdam
New York
Art Nouveau commercial buildings
Commercial buildings completed in 1917
Hotels in the Netherlands
Evicted squats